Julius Curtius (7 February 1877 – 10 November 1948) was a German politician who served as Minister for Economic Affairs (from January 1926 to December 1929) and Foreign Minister of the Weimar Republic (from October/November 1929 to October 1931).

Early life

Julius Curtius was born on 7 February 1877 at Duisburg in what was then the Prussian Rhine Province.

Friedrich's brother was Theodor Curtius, a professor of chemistry. Julius' mother was Adele (1824–98, née Brockhoff).

Julius married Adda Carp (died 1950), sister of industrialist Werner Carp, in 1905. They had two sons and three daughters.

Curtius studied law at Kiel, Strasbourg and Bonn and was awarded a doctorate at Berlin. In 1905, he started practicing law at Duisburg. After 1911, he began working on issues in the field of public policy (Staatswissenschaften) at Heidelberg. He served in the First World War, finishing at the rank of Hauptmann (captain) of the Landwehr and Batterieführer and was awarded both Iron Crosses. He remained at Heidelberg where he also was a member of the city council (Stadtverordneter) until 1921. He then worked as a lawyer at the Kammergericht Berlin. He mainly represented (also as a member of supervisory boards) firms in the steel and coal, potash and railway rolling stock businesses. From 1920 to 1932, he was a member of the Reichstag for the German People's Party (DVP).

Minister
Curtius became Reichswirtschaftsminister (Minister for Economic Affairs) in January 1926 as a member of the second cabinet of Hans Luther and remained in that office in several different cabinets that followed. After Gustav Stresemann died on 3 October 1929, Curtius became the acting Foreign Minister and in November vacated his old position and took over the Auswärtiges Amt.

As a minister he supported job-creation schemes and a close cooperation with the Soviet Union, especially in economic affairs. His main achievement was - as collaborator and "heir" of Stresemann - progress in the question of wartime reparations and the return of the occupied Rhineland. As the minister responsible for the Young Plan, Curtius was heavily criticized by DNVP, Der Stahlhelm, Nazis and the Pan-German League, who labelled him a "traitor to the fatherland".

Curtius unsuccessfully worked with Austria's Johann Schober in March 1931 to set up a German-Austrian custom union. However, France blocked this by putting economic pressure on Austria and by bringing about a decision by the Permanent Court of International Justice at The Hague , which voted 8:7 to rule the union in contradiction of the Geneva protocol of 1922 (see ). This caused Curtius to resign on 3 October 1931.

To prevent the union being established, the French had withdrawn a number of short loans they had made to Austria; the withdrawal of the French loans helped to cause the collapse of Creditanstalt, Austria's largest bank, in May 1931, which in its turn brought about a series of banking collapses all over Central Europe in the summer of 1931.

Curtius was intimately involved in the negotiations that led to the issuing of the Hoover Moratorium by the U.S President Herbert Hoover that halted war reparations payments by Germany in June 1931 as part of the effort to limit the financial fall-out of the banking collapse.

Later life and death
Following his resignation, Curtius left politics and worked as a lawyer, asset manager and farmer. After his house in Berlin was destroyed in World War II and his estate in Mecklenburg was seized by the Communist authorities he moved to Heidelberg in July 1946. Curtius died at Heidelberg on 10 November 1948.

Works
 Über die Einführung von Volksinitiative und Volksreferendum in der neuen Verfassungen der deutschen Staaten, 1919
 Bismarcks Plan eines deutschen Volkswirtschaftsrats, 1919
 Was im Haag erreicht wurde, 1929
 Innere Konsolidierung und außenpolitische Aktionsfähigkeit, 1930
 Zur nationalen Freiheit, in: Um Deutschlands Zukunft, 1931, p. 17-38
 Germany and the Polish Corridor, 1933
 Bemühung um Österreich, Das Scheitern des Zollunionsplans von 1931, 1947
 Sechs Jahre Minister der deutschen Republik, 1948
 Der Young-Plan, Entstellung und Wahrheit, 1950

References

External links

 Curtius at the Akten der Reichskanzlei online edition (German)
 Curtius at the Datenbank der deutschen Parlamentsabgeordneten, with pictures (German)
 

1877 births
1948 deaths
Economy ministers of Germany
Foreign Ministers of Germany
German People's Party politicians
German Protestants
Members of the Reichstag of the Weimar Republic
People from Duisburg
People from the Rhine Province
Weimar Republic politicians